Judy Wright (born 9 January 1956) is a Canadian former swimmer. Wright competed in two events at the 1972 Summer Olympics. Despite being Canadian she won the 'Open' British Swimming Championships in 1970, over the 440 yards freestyle and the 880 yards freestyle.

References

External links
 

1956 births
Living people
Canadian female freestyle swimmers
Olympic swimmers of Canada
Swimmers at the 1972 Summer Olympics
Swimmers from Vancouver
Swimmers at the 1974 British Commonwealth Games
Commonwealth Games gold medallists for Canada
Commonwealth Games bronze medallists for Canada
Commonwealth Games medallists in swimming
Medallists at the 1974 British Commonwealth Games